Józef Dąbrowski (January 27, 1842 – February 15, 1903) was a Polish Catholic priest.

Early life and ordination 
Józef Dąbrowski was born in Zoltance, Poland at a time when it was held by Russia. Dąbrowski studied at the Lublin gimnazjum, then the University of Warsaw. He participated in the Polish January Uprising of 1863, and fled to Dresden in 1864, then to Lucerne and Berne where he continued his studies in mathematics. After this he went to Rome and came under the direction of well-known Resurrectionist Father Peter Semenenko. He was ordained a priest in Rome on August 1, 1869.

Pastoral work in America 
In 1870, Dąbrowski went to Wisconsin, United States to do pastoral work among Polish Americans. In a letter from St. Francis Seminary to Father Semenenko dated 22 January 1870, he expressed concern about demoralized conditions among the Poles in the United States.

SS. Cyril and Methodius Seminary 
Dąbrowski founded the SS. Cyril and Methodius Seminary in Detroit (1887), 
becoming its first rector.

Schools of higher education 
Dąbrowski urged the Resurrectionists to come to Chicago or Milwaukee and establish schools of higher education where they might send out missionaries to the scattered Poles.

In 1870 he was appointed pastor of Polonia, Wisconsin, where he fought against the unfortunate conditions there until 1870.

Erection of new parish buildings 
Dąbrowski was gifted 20 acres (81,000 m²) of land by an Irishman for the erection of new parish buildings, and he abandoned the old site.

In 1879 the rectory was destroyed by fire and in 1880 fire destroyed the church and the new rectory. Father Dabrowski rebuilt the buildings. In 1882 failing health forced him to resign and leave for Detroit, Michigan. In 1874 he introduced the Felician Sisters from Kraków into the United States. Their community multiplied throughout the country, welcoming the immigrants, teaching thousands of Polish children, and caring for a multitude of Polish orphans and working girls.

Polish seminary 
At the suggestion of Cardinal Ledóchowski, who was unable to meet the constant appeals of American bishops for Polish priests and ecclesiastical students, Father Leopold Moczygemba, a Franciscan who had laboured in America and was then penitentiary of St. Peter's, Rome, went, with papal approval, to America and collected funds ($8000) for a Polish seminary.

Being advanced in years, Father Moczygemba felt unable to prosecute the work with vigor, and entrusted the task to Father Dabrowski. The latter began building the seminary in 1884, and on 24 July 1885, Bishop Stephen V. Ryan of the Roman Catholic Diocese of Buffalo blessed the cornerstone in the presence of Bishop Borgess of Detroit.

The seminary was opened in 1887, and for nineteen years Father Dabrowski served as its rector. In 1902 it was enlarged, and in 1909 it was removed to Orchard Lake, Michigan.

Death 
A few days before his death, Father Dabrowski expelled 29 students from the seminary for open rebellion. On 9 Feb., 1903, he suffered a paralytic stroke and died. He died at Detroit, February 15, 1903.

Notes

1842 births
1903 deaths
People from Oakland County, Michigan
People from Portage County, Wisconsin
19th-century Polish Roman Catholic priests
Polish emigrants to the United States
January Uprising participants